Harry Clifton may refer to:

 Harry Clifton (poet) (born 1952), Irish poet
 Harry Clifton (actor), American silent film actor
 Harry Clifton (footballer, born 1914) (1914–1998), English footballer
 Harry Clifton (footballer, born 1998), Welsh footballer for Grimsby Town F.C.
 Harry Clifton (producer) (1907–1979), English aristocrat and film producer
 Harry Clifton (singer) (1832–1872), English music hall singer and songwriter

See also
 Henry Robert Clifton (1832–1896), High Sheriff of Nottinghamshire
 Harold Clifton, main character in Clifton (comics)
 Curley Byrd (Harry Clifton Byrd, 1889–1970), American university administrator, athlete and coach